Antônio Carlos da Silva (born 15 February 1968), commonly known as Buião, is a Brazilian football coach and former player who played as a forward. He is the current assistant manager of Santos' under-20 team.

Playing career
Born in Marília, São Paulo, Buião was a youth graduate of hometown side Marília. For the 1990 season, he joined Palmeiras, where he featured sparingly.

After leaving Palmeiras in May 1990, Buião moved to fellow Série A side Náutico, and signed for Guarani in the following February. After featuring in only one match, he subsequently represented Taquaritinga, Comercial-SP, Sãocarlense and União Barbarense, winning the 1998 Campeonato Paulista Série A2 with the latter.

In 1998, Buião moved abroad for the first time in his career and joined Chinese side Shanghai Pudong. He moved to Colombia in the following year, and played for Deportes Tolima and Atlético Huila before returning to his home country with Sãocarlense in 2002; he retired shortly after, aged 34.

Coaching career
After retiring, Buião worked as an assistant of Marco Aurélio at Ponte Preta in 2004. His first coaching experience came in 2006, as he was in charge of Sumaré.

In 2008, Buião was the head coach of São Judas Tadeu and the under-20 side of Comercial de Registro. He was named at the helm of Grêmio Jaciara in 2009, before returning to his native state in the following year with the under-20 team of Rio Claro.

Buião returned to Jaciara for the 2011 campaign, before again returning to São Judas Tadeu.

On 25 September 2014, Buião was announced as head coach of Rio Claro for the 2015 Campeonato Paulista. He was dismissed on 11 March 2015, and spent more than a year without coaching before taking over Paracatu for the 2017 campaign.

Sacked on 3 April 2017, Buião was appointed head coach of Carajás on 7 October. On 17 December, he took over Paranavaí, and also worked at Brasilis later in 2018.

Buião returned to Paracatu on 12 March 2019, and was named in charge of Real Brasília the following 21 January. He was sacked by the latter on 23 July 2020, and moved to the under-20 squad of Santos in February 2022, as Orlando Ribeiro's assistant.

In September 2022, as Ribeiro was named interim head coach of the main squad, Buião took over the under-20s.

Honours

Player
União Barbarense
Campeonato Paulista Série A2: 1998

References

1968 births
Living people
People from Marília
Footballers from São Paulo
Brazilian footballers
Association football forwards
Campeonato Brasileiro Série A players
Campeonato Brasileiro Série B players
Marília Atlético Clube players
Sociedade Esportiva Palmeiras players
Clube Náutico Capibaribe players
Guarani FC players
Clube Atlético Taquaritinga players
Comercial Futebol Clube (Ribeirão Preto) players
Grêmio Esportivo Sãocarlense players
União Agrícola Barbarense Futebol Clube players
Deportes Tolima footballers
Atlético Huila footballers
Brazilian expatriate footballers
Brazilian expatriate sportspeople in China
Brazilian expatriate sportspeople in Colombia
Expatriate footballers in China
Expatriate footballers in Colombia
Brazilian football managers
Rio Claro Futebol Clube managers
Santos FC non-playing staff